Basketball is the second most popular sport in the United States (counting amateur levels), after American football. In terms of revenue, the National Basketball Association (NBA) is the third most profitable sports league in the United States and the world, after the National Football League (NFL) and Major League Baseball (MLB). According to the National Sporting Goods Association, over 26 million Americans play basketball regularly, more than any other team sport.
Basketball was invented in 1891 by Canadian physical education teacher James Naismith in Springfield, Massachusetts.

NBA
The National Basketball Association (NBA) is the world's premier men's professional basketball league and one of the major professional sports leagues of North America. It contains 30 teams (29 teams in the U.S. and 1 in Canada) that play an 82-game season from October to June. After the regular season, eight teams from each conference compete in the playoffs for the Larry O'Brien Championship Trophy.
 The NBA gets high ratings on television.

Race and ethnicity

The composition of race and ethnicity in the National Basketball Association (NBA) has changed throughout the league's history.

By 2020, 81.1% of players in the NBA are Black (if mixed are also counted as black), 17.9% white, 12.5% mixed race (mostly half-black half-white), and 1.1% of other races. The league has the highest percentage of Black players of any major professional sports leagues in the United States and Canada. As of 2020, the NBA's viewership appears to be predominantly Black and Hispanic.

National teams

Since the 1992 Summer Olympics, NBA players have represented the United States in international competition and won numerous important tournaments. The Dream Team was the unofficial nickname of the United States men's basketball team that won the gold medal at the 1992 Olympics. The Women's national team has won eight gold medals at the Olympics.

High school Basketball

High school Basketball is a popular activity. The National Federation of State High School Associations featured 541,479 boys and 429,504 girls in basketball teams as of the 2014–15 season.

Many high school basketball teams have intense local followings, especially in the Midwest and Upper South. Indiana has 10 of the 12 largest high school gyms in the United States, and is famous for its basketball passion, known as Hoosier Hysteria.

College Basketball

College basketball is quite popular and draws TV high ratings. Every March, a 68-team, six-round, single-elimination tournament (commonly called March Madness) determines the national champions of NCAA Division I men's basketball tournament men's college basketball.

Women's Basketball

The Women's National Basketball Association or WNBA is an organization governing a professional basketball league for women in the United States. The WNBA was formed in 1996 as the women's counterpart to the National Basketball Association, and league play began in 1997. The regular WNBA season is June to September (North American Spring and Summer). Most WNBA teams play at the same venue as their NBA counterparts. The WNBA is the premier professional Basketball league for women in the world. Despite being the premier women's basketball league the WNBA struggles to attract a large mainstream audience. Women's NCAA Basketball is also popular, although less so than men's basketball.

The women's national team has won eight Olympic gold medals and ten FIBA World Cups.

References

External links